Ova Confident is one of the singles off of rapper Nine's 1995 album Nine Livez. The chorus samples KRS-One's vocals from "Rough...", a Queen Latifah track KRS-One Appeared on along with Heavy D and Naughty By Nature's Treach from Queen Latifah's 1993 album Black Reign.

1995 singles
Profile Records albums